"Down Down Down" is a song by Charlie Simpson from his album Young Pilgrim. The phrase may also refer to:
"Down Down Down", an episode of the superhero television series Batwoman
"Down, Down, Down", a song by Joe Satriani from his self-titled album